Cappadocia (from Old Persian 𐎣𐎫𐎱𐎬𐎢𐎣 Katpatuka) was a satrapy (province) of the Achaemenid Empire located in Anatolia (modern-day Turkey). It was used by the Achaemenids to administer the regions beyond the Taurus Mountains and the Euphrates river.

The Satrapy
The Satrapy belonged to the third tax district and paid an estimated 360 talents a year in tribute. The first satrap (governor) known by name is Ariaramnes, who ruled sometime at the beginning of the reign of the Achaemenid king Darius the Great. His successors are unknown, although , the half brother of Xerxes, commanded the Cappadocians in 480 BCE. During the reign of Artaxerxes II, Cappadocia was divided, becoming Paphlagonia and Cappadocia Proper.  Datames (abridged from Datamithra) then became the satrap of southern Cappadocia; he led a revolt and was later assassinated in 362 BCE. The last Achaemenid satrap of Cappadocia was Mithrobuzanes, who died in 334 BCE at the Battle of the Granicus fighting Alexander's invading army.

Satraps of Cappadocia (c. 380–331 BC)
Ariaramnes, c.500 BCE
Datames, c. 380–362 BC
Ariamnes I, 362–350 BC
Mithrobuzanes (died 334)
Ariarathes I, 350–331 BC

See also
Cappadocian calendar
List of rulers of Cappadocia
Kingdom of Cappadocia
Cappadocia

References

 
Achaemenid satrapies